High Road is a major road running through Lynwood, Parkwood, Ferndale, Riverton, and Willetton in the south-east of Perth, Western Australia. It connects the major roads Leach Highway, and Albany Highway via Nicholson Road, originally built to provide the Gosnells area with direct access to the port city of Fremantle.

It is allocated State Route 27.

See also

References

Roads in Perth, Western Australia